Chiang Mai Creative City is an initiative to develop Chiang Mai into a creative city. A creative city is a city where cultural and creative activities are an integral part of the city's economic and social functioning. The experience of other cities which have implemented such strategies has shown that they can be more successful (with meeting their development objectives) than cities which have not. On 31 October 2017, Chiang Mai has been designated as a UNECO Crafts and Folk Art Creative Cities Network.

Background 
The Chiang Mai Creative City Development Committee was set up by the Governor of Chiang Mai and consists of members from the education, private and government sectors. The Governor of Chiang Mai Province, the president of Chiang Mai University, the president of Payap University, the president of North Chiang Mai University, and the US Consul General are advisors.

The Development Committee organised several activities such as a logo and website design competition and a seminar on how to develop a creative city with a guest speaker from Austin. One of the next events is with guest speaker from UNESCO to discuss how Chiang Mai could become a UNESCO recognised Creative City.

The objective of the Development Committee are to develop a road-map and strategy for Chiang Mai Creative City, coordinate and share information across stakeholders, coordinate and govern projects, implement and operate activities and projects, set up working committees and working teams as required.

Chiang Mai University was nominated to chair the Development Committee and to provide the secretariat and point of contact. At the present staff is allocated on a part-time and voluntary basis (by CMU).

The Development Committee is not a legal entity, but relies on its formal and informal members to support and work together. Longer-term, the Development Committee may need to institutionally developed further and become a legal entity, but is premature to conclude this now. The way of working of the Development Committee is on a consensus but also voluntary basis. This means that the Development Committee can suggest policies, projects, and activities (and if asked coordinate and govern these), but it is up to the members to implement these (and provide resources).

The initiative covers creative clusters but also other issues such as urban development, education, R&D and innovation and collaboration. Some of the involved stakeholders put emphasis on the IT, software and digital content sector - since it is an important growth sector and an enabler for other sectors. Moreover, this sector also has a high potential for generating spillover effects, creating value-added, and attracting additional investment.

Existing key sectors such as tourism (e.g. medical tourism, cultural tourism, historical tourism), handicrafts (jewellery, silverware, celadon and other forms of pottery, textile, etc.), food/agro-industry, and healthcare are also targeted and can be upgraded using new designs, processes, IT, (technology-based) innovation, and creative thinking.

Vision and Mission 
The time frame for Chiang Mai Creative City needs to be long-term (15–20 years). Medium-term, the vision and objectives should align with Thailand's next national social and economic development plan (2012–2016), which will have a strong emphasis on creativity, creative economy, knowledge and innovation. Creative industries comprise 13% of total GDP (2009) and the government intends to increase this to at least 20%. Chiang Mai has an opportunity to take a significant share of this growth.

The vision may include the following aspects:

“Chiang Mai will become a recognized center for IT, digital content, and other creative sectors, activities and talent. Technology, design, creative thinking and innovation support existing key industries as well as the social, environmental and economic objectives of the city, province and people. It is attractive as a place for living, investing, retiring, visiting, studying and working.”

The mission of the Chiang Mai Creative City initiative includes

 Developing talent to better meet the needs of industry and society
 Marketing Chiang Mai as an attractive location for investment and business
 Developing the creative industries in Chiang Mai, including IT, software and digital content cluster – leverage to develop existing industries
 Develop city into a stronger growth engine and service hub for the rest of Northern Thailand
 Creating more business opportunities and jobs
 Promoting creativity (creative thinking, innovation, etc.) at all levels
 Ensuring that Chiang Mai's historic and cultural heritage are preserved and that development is sustainable
 Embracing and creating benefits for all key stakeholders groups

References

External links 
 

Chiang Mai